Horridovalva is a genus of moths in the family Gelechiidae.

Species
 Horridovalva renatella (Amsel, 1978)
 Horridovalva tenuiella Sattler, 1967

References

Anomologinae